Lota is a Portuguese feminine given name that is a diminutive form of Carlota, a nickname and surname. Notable people referred to by this name include the following:

Given name
Lota Bowen (1872–1935), British painter

Nickname/stagename
Lota Chukwu, stagename of Ugwu Lotachukwu Jacinta Obianuju Amelia, Nigerian actress
Lota Delgado, nickname of Carlota Concepcion Delgado (1918-2009), Filipino actress 
Lota de Macedo Soares, nickname of Maria Carlota Costallat de Macedo Soares, (1910-1967), Brazilian landscape designer and architect

Surname
Dennis Lota (1973–2014), Zambian football player

See also

Lata (disambiguation)
Lita (given name)
Loa (disambiguation)
Loka (disambiguation)
Lola (given name)
Loma (disambiguation)
Lora (disambiguation)
Lot (name)
Lotan (disambiguation)
Lotar (name)
Lote (disambiguation)
Alfred J. Lotka
Lotta (name)
Loza (surname)

Notes

Portuguese feminine given names